The Women's 400 metres event  at the 2006 IAAF World Indoor Championships was held on March 10–12.

Medalists

Results

Heats
First 2 of each heat (Q) and the next 4 fastest (q) qualified for the semifinals.

Semifinals
First 3 of each semifinal qualified directly (Q) for the final.

Final

References
Results

400
400 metres at the World Athletics Indoor Championships
2006 in women's athletics